Santa Clara is a city in Guadalupe County, Texas, United States. The population was 725 at the 2010 census, down from 889 at the 2000 census. It is part of the San Antonio Metropolitan Statistical Area.

Santa Clara was incorporated as a city in May 1999.

Geography

Santa Clara is located in western Guadalupe County at  (29.584036, –98.166763). It is west and north of Marion and east of Cibolo.

Demographics

As of the census of 2000, there were 889 people, 297 households, and 247 families residing in the city. The population density was 428.0 people per square mile (165.0/km). There were 310 housing units at an average density of 149.2/sq mi (57.5/km). The racial makeup of the city was 90.21% White, 1.35% African American, 0.67% Native American, 0.11% Asian, 0.11% Pacific Islander, 5.62% from other races, and 1.91% from two or more races. Hispanic or Latino of any race were 13.16% of the population.

There were 297 households, out of which 43.4% had children under the age of 18 living with them, 74.7% were married couples living together, 5.7% had a female householder with no husband present, and 16.5% were non-families. 12.1% of all households were made up of individuals, and 4.0% had someone living alone who was 65 years of age or older. The average household size was 2.99 and the average family size was 3.27.

In the city, the population was spread out, with 28.6% under the age of 18, 8.2% from 18 to 24, 28.1% from 25 to 44, 26.3% from 45 to 64, and 8.8% who were 65 years of age or older. The median age was 37 years. For every 100 females, there were 102.0 males. For every 100 females age 18 and over, there were 95.4 males.

The median income for a household in the city was $51,250, and the median income for a family was $54,500. Males had a median income of $36,447 versus $27,313 for females. The per capita income for the city was $31,971. About 1.8% of families and 7.9% of the population were below the poverty line, including 15.0% of those under age 18 and none of those age 65 or over.

Education
Santa Clara is served by the Marion Independent School District.

References

External links
 City of Santa Clara official website

Cities in Guadalupe County, Texas
Cities in Texas
Greater San Antonio
1999 establishments in Texas
Populated places established in 1999